The Men's 50 km walk event at the 1994 European Championships was held on 13 August 1994 in Helsinki, Finland. There were a total number of 34 participating athletes.

Medalists

Abbreviations
All times shown are in hours:minutes:seconds

Startlist

Intermediates

Final ranking

Participation
According to an unofficial count, 34 athletes from 15 countries participated in the event.

 (3)
 (2)
 (3)
 (3)
 (3)
 (2)
 (3)
 (1)
 (1)
 (3)
 (3)
 (3)
 (1)
 (2)
 (1)

See also
 1991 Men's World Championships 50km Walk (Tokyo)
 1992 Men's Olympic 50km Walk (Barcelona)
 1993 Men's World Championships 50km Walk (Stuttgart)
 1995 Men's World Championships 50km Walk (Gothenburg)
 1996 Men's Olympic 50km Walk (Atlanta)
 1997 Men's World Championships 50km Walk (Athens)

References

 Results

Walk 50 km
Racewalking at the European Athletics Championships